Imre Nyéki (1 November 1928 – 27 March 1995) was a Hungarian swimmer and Olympic medalist. He participated at the 1948 Summer Olympics, winning a silver medal in 4 × 200 metre freestyle relay. He also competed at the 1952 Summer Olympics.

References

1928 births
1995 deaths
Hungarian male swimmers
Olympic swimmers of Hungary
Olympic silver medalists for Hungary
Swimmers at the 1948 Summer Olympics
Swimmers at the 1952 Summer Olympics
Hungarian male freestyle swimmers
European Aquatics Championships medalists in swimming
European champions for Hungary
Medalists at the 1948 Summer Olympics
Olympic silver medalists in swimming
20th-century Hungarian people